Andrés de las Navas y Quevedo, O. de M. (1632 – 2 November 1702) was a Roman Catholic prelate who served as Bishop of Santiago de Guatemala (1682–1702)
and Bishop of Nicaragua (1677–1682).

Biography
Pedro Gómez de Córdoba was born in Baza, Spain and ordained a priest in 1660 in the Order of the Blessed Virgin Mary of Mercy.
On 13 September 1677, he was appointed during the papacy of Pope Innocent XI as Bishop of Nicaragua. On 13 September 1677, he was consecrated bishop by Juan de Ortega Cano Montañez y Patiño, Bishop of Santiago de Guatemala and installed on 23 February 1679. On 15 June 1682, he was selected by the King of Spain and confirmed by Pope Innocent XI on 15 February 1683 as Bishop of Santiago de Guatemala. He was installed on 24 March 1683.  He served as Bishop of Santiago de Guatemala until his death on 2 November 1702.

While bishop, he was the principal consecrator of Ildefonso Vargas y Abarca, Bishop of Comayagua (1679).

References

External links and additional sources
 (for Chronology of Bishops) 
 (for Chronology of Bishops) 
 (for Chronology of Bishops) 
 (for Chronology of Bishops) 

17th-century Roman Catholic bishops in Nicaragua
18th-century Roman Catholic bishops in Guatemala
Bishops appointed by Pope Innocent XI
1632 births
1702 deaths
People from the Province of Granada
Mercedarian bishops
Roman Catholic bishops of León in Nicaragua
Roman Catholic bishops of Guatemala (pre-1743)